Drop Zone is a 1994 American action thriller film directed by John Badham, starring Wesley Snipes, Gary Busey, Yancy Butler, Michael Jeter, Sam Hennings, Luca Bercovici and Kyle Secor. When a U.S. Marshal has to break up a drug smuggling gang, he has to take to the skies. Drop Zone was released by Paramount Pictures in the United States on December 9, 1994.

Plot
Aboard a commercial Boeing 747 airliner, U.S. Marshals brothers Terry and Pete Nessip are escorting computer expert Earl Leedy to a high-security prison. When an apparent terrorist hijack attempt blows a hole in the airliner, Terry is sucked out falling more than 30,000 feet to his death, and the terrorists parachute out of the same hole, taking Leedy with them.

Ex-DEA agent and renegade skydiver Ty Moncrief is the mastermind behind the attack, which culminated in the first ever parachute jump from a commercial jet at 30,000 feet. Ty plans to use Leedy to hack into the DEA mainframe computer in Washington, D.C. so Ty can auction off the names of undercover agents to drug cartels worldwide. Ty has scheduled this to be accomplished during an Independence Day parachute exhibition and fireworks display, which is the one day every year when security is loosened around the airspace above D.C.

Pete believes that the hijacking may have been an elaborate prison break meant to free Leedy. However, the FBI declares that sneaking a parachute through airport security is impossible, and that parachuting at the jet's altitude and speed is not survivable. A devastated Pete is blamed for overreacting to the incident, and forced to turn in his badge.

Undeterred, Pete consults a U.S. Navy high-altitude military parachuting instructor who confirms that he and his team have parachuted from that height and speed, but also states that the high-density metal rings in the parachutes would not pass airport metal detectors and that the operation required either rare skills or suicidal recklessness. The instructor believes the world class skydiver Don Jagger could perform the jump, but does not know his current whereabouts. Pete is instead referred to Jagger's reckless ex-girlfriend, ex-con Jessie Crossman, who runs a skydiving school in the Florida Keys. Jessie, who is unaware that Jagger is part of Ty's crew, agrees to train Pete how to skydive, if he will sponsor her team for the parachute exhibition.

Soon after, Jagger is found dead, tangled in some high voltage power lines, after his identity was exposed by a passenger during the hijacking. Jessie breaks into the police impound to examine Jagger's parachute, declares that his death was a murder engineered by Ty, and swears revenge. Pete inquires as to the parachute's lack of metal, which Jessie explains is a custom "smuggler's rig" made with high density fabrics to deter detection.

When Pete discovers Ty's plan to hack into the DEA mainframe, the rest of the parachuting team agrees to help Pete with the situation. Jessie's parachuting friend Selkirk is severely injured after using a faulty parachute that Ty had intended for Jessie to use.

On the night of the Independence Day exhibition, Jessie sneaks into Ty's parachuting aircraft, holding them at gunpoint in order to determine an explanation for Jagger's death. But Ty's men kick her outside and then parachute out. Jessie, managing to grab hold of the aircraft door bar, lets go on a free fall just as Pete and the parachuting team arrive and rescue her, floating down safety to the roof of the DEA mainframe office building where Ty has already arrived.

Pete tries to find access to the DEA mainframe control room, eliminating Ty's men one by one, with the help of the parachuting team. He breaks in and holds Leedy (who has already started downloading the identities) as hostage. Ty, having kidnapped Jessie, appears and threatens to kill her unless Pete releases Leedy. A fight breaks out between Pete and Ty that results in both of them falling out the building window.

Luckily, Pete opens his emergency parachute as Ty tumbles to his death. Pete lands safely on the ground and is escorted away by paramedics, but spots Leedy wearing a DEA jacket leaving the scene. One of the team members, Swoop, leaps from the building, parachuting down onto Leedy and stopping him in his tracks. Pete tells Jessie jokingly that he would try skydiving again in 40 or 50 years.

Cast

 Wesley Snipes as U.S. Marshal Pete Nessip
 Gary Busey as Ty Moncrief
 Yancy Butler as Jessie Crossman
 Michael Jeter as Earl Leedy
 Kyle Secor as "Swoop"
 Corin Nemec as Selkirk "Selly" Power
 Malcolm-Jamal Warner as U.S. Marshal Terry Nessip
 Grace Zabriskie as Winona Santoro
 Rex Linn as Robby Walker
 Sam Hennings as Torski
 Claire Stansfield as Kara Sellar
 Mickey Jones as "Deuce"
 Robert LaSardo as "Deputy Dog"
 Andy Romano as U.S. Marshals Deputy Director Tom McCracken
 Luca Bercovici as Don Jagger

Production

The original idea came from two professional skydivers, Tony Griffin and Guy Manos. One of the film's screenwriters, Peter Barsocchini, would later write High School Musical. Steven Seagal was originally attached to star (for a rumored $15 million).

The insurance policies of Wesley Snipes and most of the cast precluded them from skydiving. However, Michael Jeter actually performed the tandem jump. The green Douglas C-47 Skytrain used in the skydiving scenes is currently on display at the Valiant Air Command air museum in Titusville, Florida.

Release

Theatrical
Drop Zone was one of two skydiving action films released in December 1994; the other was Terminal Velocity.

Home media
Drop Zone was released on Video CD in 1996. The Drop Zone DVD was released in Region 1 on May 25, 1999 and Region 2 on June 5, 2000. The home media versions were distributed by Paramount Home Entertainment.

Reception

Box office
Drop Zone had a modest debut at the US box office and experienced a 52% drop in its second weekend. Drop Zone ultimately grossed $29 million in the United States and Canada, and $62 million worldwide against its $45 million budget.

Critical response
Drop Zone received a mixed reaction from reviewers. Film critic Lisa Schwarzbaum in  Entertainment Weekly, said, "There's something deafening and reckless and hotdogging about Drop Zone, and I mean that as a compliment. This macho action fantasy from subculture specialist John Badham (Saturday Night Fever (1977), WarGames (1983)) is set in the daredevil society of sky divers, where Pete Nessip (Wesley Snipes), an unlikely federal marshal who is the last man around you'd expect to see pulling a rip cord, throws in with a band of professional plane leapers based in swampy Florida."

Roger Ebert noted: "Drop Zone" is one of those thrillers where the action is so interesting that you almost forgive (or even forget) the plot. The movie is virtually one stunt after another, many of them taking place in mid air, and during the pure action sequences you simply suspend your interest in the story and look at the amazing sights before you."

Film critic Chris Hicks saw one major problem, "As the film moves along, however, plotting becomes more and more illogical – and late in the film there are bits of business that remove the story so far from reality that audience goodwill is stretched to breaking point. Suspension of disbelief is one thing, but this film asks us to abandon it altogether."

The review in The Washington Post accentuated the positives before dissecting  "a bad movie idea"  and its predictable improbability. Drop Zone currently holds a 39% rating on Rotten Tomatoes based on 23 reviews. Audiences polled by CinemaScore gave the film an average grade of "B+" on an A+ to F scale.

Year-end lists
 Top 18 worst (alphabetically listed, not ranked) – Michael Mills, The Palm Beach Post
Dishonorable mention – Glenn Lovell, San Jose Mercury News

Other media

In popular culture
The Paramount Parks (now owned by Cedar Fair) featured drop tower amusement rides called Drop Zone: Stunt Tower, which were based on the film. The attractions are now named Drop Tower: Scream Zone.

Artist Todd Higley's title song "Jump You So Hard" was inspired by his short-lived relationship with female lead Yancy Butler. The musical sting that plays when Swoop races to help the stricken skydiver (from the track "Too Many Notes - Not Enough Rests") has been frequently used in film trailers, most notably The Mask of Zorro (1998), Puss in Boots (2011) and Pirates of the Caribbean: The Curse of the Black Pearl (2003), the latter of which, also scored by Hans Zimmer, used an adaptation of the piece as its main theme.

Notes

References

Bibliography

 Beck, Simon D. The Aircraft Spotter's Film and Television Companion. Jefferson, North Carolina, 2016. .
 Floyd, Nigel. "Review: 'Drop Zone'." in Pym, John, ed. Time Out Film Guide. London: Time Out Guides Limited, 2004. .
 Meyer, Stephen C. Music in Epic Film: Listening to Spectacle. London: Taylor & Francis, 2016. .

External links
 
 
 
 Valiant Air Command Warbirds Museum

1994 films
1994 action films
1990s American films
1990s English-language films
American action thriller films
American aviation films
Films about aviation accidents or incidents
Films about terrorism in the United States
Films about the Drug Enforcement Administration
Films directed by John Badham
Films scored by Hans Zimmer
Films set in Florida
Films set in Miami
Films set in Washington, D.C.
Independence Day (United States) films
Paramount Pictures films
Skydiving in fiction
United States Marshals Service in fiction